Deepak Madhav Dhavalikar, also known as Deepak 'Pandurang' Dhavalikar (born 14 May 1958 in Bandora, Ponda), is an Indian politician from the state of Goa. He is a two-term member of the Goa Legislative Assembly representing the Priol constituency. He is president of MGP and has played key role in keeping the party alive in Goan politics. He was Minister in Goa Government for the period 2012–2016.

He is from the Maharashtrawadi Gomantak Party Goa's first ruling party after the end of Portuguese colonial rule in 1961. He was sacked from the Laxmikant Parsekar led government in Goa in December 2016.

External links 
  Goa councle of ministers

References 

Living people
1958 births
Goa politicians
Members of the Goa Legislative Assembly
Maharashtrawadi Gomantak Party politicians
People from North Goa district